Epi Info is statistical software for epidemiology developed by Centers for Disease Control and Prevention (CDC) in Atlanta, Georgia (US).

Epi Info has been in existence for over 20 years and is currently available for Microsoft Windows, Android and iOS, along with a web and cloud version. The program allows for electronic survey creation, data entry, and analysis.  Within the analysis module, analytic routines include t-tests, ANOVA, nonparametric statistics, cross tabulations and stratification with estimates of odds ratios, risk ratios, and risk differences, logistic regression (conditional and unconditional), survival analysis (Kaplan Meier and Cox proportional hazard), and analysis of complex survey data. The software is an open-source project with limited support.

An analysis conducted in 2003 documented over 1,000,000 downloads of Epi Info from 180 countries.

History 

Epi Info has been in development for over 20 years. The first version, Epi Info 1, was originally developed by Jeff Dean while he was in high school.  It was an MS-DOS batch file on 5.25" floppy disks and released in 1985. MS-DOS continued to be the only supported operating system until the release of Epi Info 2000, which was written in Microsoft's Visual Basic and became the first Windows-compatible version. The last MS-DOS version was Epi Info 6.04d released in January 2001.

Epi Info 2000 changed the way data was stored by adopting the Microsoft Access database format, rather than continuing to use the plain-text file format from the MS-DOS versions. Following the release of Epi Info 2000 was Epi Info 2002, then Epi Info version 3.0, and finally the open-source Epi Info 7. Epi Info 7 was made open source on November 13, 2008, when its source code was uploaded to Codeplex for the first time. The 7 series is the presently maintained Epi Info product line. Note that Epi Info 3 for Windows is different from Epi Info 3 for MS-DOS even though they share the same version number.

After Microsoft shut down Codeplex in December 2017, the repository of Epi Info migrated to GitHub.

Features 

From a user's perspective, the most important functions of Epi Info are the ability to rapidly develop a questionnaire, customize the data entry process, quickly enter data into that questionnaire, and then analyze the data. For epidemiological uses, such as outbreak investigations, being able to rapidly create an electronic data entry screen and then do immediate analysis on the collected data can save considerable amounts of time versus using paper surveys.

Epi Info uses three distinct modules to accomplish these tasks: Form Designer, Enter, and Analysis. Other modules include the Dashboard module, a mapping module, and various utilities such as StatCalc.

Electronic questionnaires can also be created in the Form Designer module. Individual questions can be placed anywhere on a page and each form may contain multiple pages. The user is given a high degree of control over the form's appearance and function. The user defines both the question's prompt and the format of the data that is to be collected. Data types include numbers, text strings, dates, times, and Boolean. Users can also create drop-down lists, code tables, and comment legal fields. One of the more powerful features of Form Designer is the ability to program intelligence into a form through a feature called "check code". Check code allows for certain events to occur depending on what action a data entry person has taken. For example, if the data entry person types "Male" into a question on gender, any questions relating to pregnancy might then be hidden or disabled. Skip patterns, message boxes, and math operations are also available. Relational database modeling is supported, as users may link their form to any number of other forms in their database.

The "Classic Analysis" module is where users analyze their data. Import and export functions exist that allow for data to be converted between plain-text, CSV, Microsoft Excel, Microsoft Access, MySQL, Microsoft SQL Server, and other formats. Many advanced statistical routines are provided, such as t-tests, ANOVA, nonparametric statistics, cross tabulations and stratification with estimates of odds ratios, risk ratios, and risk differences, logistic regression (conditional and unconditional), survival analysis (Kaplan Meier and Cox proportional hazard), and analysis of complex survey data.

The "Visual Dashboard" module is a lighter-weight Analysis component that is designed to be easy to use, but does not contain the full set of data management features that the "Classic Analysis" module does.

Using the Map module, data can be displayed either by geographic reference or by GPS coordinates.

Older versions of Epi Info contained a Report module and a Menu module. The Report module allowed the user to edit and format the raw output from other Epi Info modules into presentable documents. The menu module allowed for the editing and re-arranging of the basic Epi Info menu structure. This module was powerful enough that several applications have been built off of it (in versions of Epi Info prior to version 7), including the National Electronic Telecommunications System for Surveillance (NETSS) for Epi Info 6. Unlike the other modules, the menu module does not have a design-mode user interface, but instead resides in a .mnu file whose scripts must be edited manually. In Epi Info 7, the Visual Dashboard assumes some of the basic functions of the report module.

Epi Info 7 includes a number of nutritional anthropometric functions that can assist in recording and evaluating measurements of length, stature, weight, head circumference, and arm circumference for children and adolescents. They can be used to calculate percentiles and number of standard deviations from the mean (Z-scores) using the CDC/WHO 1978 growth reference, CDC 2000 growth reference, the WHO Child Growth Reference, or the WHO Reference 2007. It replaces the NutStat and EpiNut modules found in prior versions of Epi Info.

Epi Info in research 
Epi Info is used for analysis in medical research, and for data entry. Examples of its use for research include a study of eye conditions, a study of healthcare infections and a study of psychiatric morbidity. Examples of papers that used Epi Info for data entry include a study on nutrition and an epidemiological survey about echinococcosis.

Reviews of Epi Info 
Epi Info is very briefly described in a review of software that might be used for research about cancer trend analysis. Another report indicated that Epi Info was among the most widely used tools during outbreaks. Another study also reported that Epi Info was among the tools used to collect data during pandemics. One study compared the statistical results from various free to use statistical software and found that Epi Info gave the same results as did SAS.

Open Epi 
OPenEpi is an online version of the software and has inbuilt statistical calculators. For more information, see the article OpenEpi.

Future developments 

Version 7 is in continuing development as an open source project. Web-based data entry, web-based analysis, and mobile data collection tools are currently available and will see continued improvement in 2014 and beyond.

Release history

See also 

CSPro
OpenEpi
X-12-ARIMA
Epi Map
Free statistical software

References

External links
Official website
All repositories on Github
Epi Info Community Edition 
Epi Info™ Companion for iOS
Epi Info™ Companion for Android
Open Epi
Epi Info - YouTube page. Official instructional videos

Centers for Disease Control and Prevention
Free health care software
Free statistical software
Public-domain software